"Turn It into Something Special" is a song recorded by German recording artist Sasha. It was written by S. Esteban, B. Moore, Ronnie Louise Taheny and Michael Amoroso for his third studio album Surfin' on a Backbeat (2001), while production was helmed by Boyd Barber. Released as the album's second single, while also serving as the theme song for the 2002 German teleplay Die Affäre Semmeling, the ballad reached the top forty of the German Singles Chart.

Formats and track listings

Charts

Weekly charts

References

External links 
 

2001 songs
2002 singles
Sasha (German singer) songs
Warner Music Group singles